The Montana First Nation is a First Nations band government in Alberta, Canada.  It is a Treaty 6 government.  Formerly the Montana Band of Indians, it is one of four First Nations in the area of Maskwacis.

Indian Reserves
There are two reserves under the governance of the band:
Montana 139
Pigeon Lake 138A

References

First Nations governments in Alberta
Cree governments